The following is a list of drivers who are currently competing in a series sanctioned by the Automobile Racing Club of America (ARCA).

ARCA Racing Series drivers
All statistics used in these tables are as of the end of the 2018 Lucas Oil 200 Driven by General Tire. (Race 1/20)

Full-time drivers

Part-time drivers

Cashiers

ARCA Midwest Tour drivers
All statistics used in these tables are as of the end of the 2016 Oktoberfest 200. (Race 10/10)

Full-time drivers

Part-time drivers

ARCA/CRA Super Series drivers
All statistics used in these tables are as of the end of the 2016 Winchester 400. (Race 13/13)

Full-time drivers

Part-time drivers

External links
ARCA Racing Series website
ARCA Racing Series drivers
ARCA Midwest Tour website
ARCA Midwest Tour all-time statistics
CRA Super Series website
Racing-Reference.info

 
Arca drivers